Scales Mound Township is one of twenty-three townships in Jo Daviess County, Illinois, USA.  As of the 2010 census, its population was 622 and it contained 286 housing units.  It was formed from Council Hill and Thompson townships on March 7, 1855.

Charles Mound, the highest point in Illinois, is located within Scales Mound Township.

Geography

The highest point in Illinois, Charles Mound (1,235 ft, 376 m) is located in Scales Mount Township.

Cities, towns, villages
 Scales Mound.

Cemeteries 
The township contains these two cemeteries: Citizens and Holy Trinity.

Demographics

School districts
 Scales Mound Community Unit School District 211.

Political districts
 Illinois' 16th congressional district.
 State House District 89.
 State Senate District 45.

References

 
 United States Census Bureau 2007 TIGER/Line Shapefiles.
 United States National Atlas.

External links
 Jo Daviess County official site.
 City-Data.com.
 Illinois State Archives.
 Township Officials of Illinois.

Townships in Jo Daviess County, Illinois
Townships in Illinois